Get Ready may refer to:

Music

Albums 
 Get Ready!, a 1992 album by 2 Unlimited
 Get Ready! (Roachford album), 1991
 Get Ready (Human Nature album), 2007
 Get Ready (Kleeer album), 1982
 Get Ready (New Order album), 2001
 Get Ready (Rare Earth album), 1969
 Get Ready (Tomomi Itano album), 2016
 Get Ready (Virtue album), 1999
 Get Ready!, an EP by Little Red

Songs 
 "Get Ready" (Temptations song), 1966, also covered by Rare Earth in 1970
 "Get Ready" (Mase song), 1999
 "Get Ready" (Shawn Desman song), 2002
 "Get Ready" (Pitbull song), 2020
 "Get Ready", single from Get Ready! (Roachford album), 1991
 "Get Ready", a song by Sublime from Sublime
 "Get Ready", a song by Bon Jovi from Bon Jovi
 "Get Ready", a song by Accept from Restless and Wild
 "Get Ready", a 1959 song by Larry Williams

See also 
 Get Ready for CBS, an image campaign for the American television network CBS